KJJM (100.5 FM, "The Rock") is a radio station licensed to serve Baker, Montana. The station is owned by Jay B. Newell, through licensee Newell Media, LLC. It airs a classic rock music format.

The station shares studios with sister KFLN, at 3584 Highway 7, north of Baker, Montana. The transmitter and tower is located farther north on Highway 7. The station has listeners in the surrounding area including Glendive, Wibaux, Bowman, Plevna, and Ekalaka.

It began broadcasting in 2001 and has had a live morning show hosted since then by Vaughn Zenko.  With the launch of the station, several former DJs appeared using alternate names inspired by "Scooby-Doo" including "Daphne Blake", "Freddy Jones", and "Shaggy Rogers" as well as another male, and previous co-host of the morning show, referred to as "The Most Hated Man in Baker". The station occasionally airs play-by-play of local high school sports.

The station was assigned the KJJM call letters by the Federal Communications Commission on May 11, 1998.

References

External links
KJJM official website

JJM
Fallon County, Montana
Classic rock radio stations in the United States
Radio stations established in 2001
2001 establishments in Montana